John Chappel , a prebendary of Cork was the Dean of Ross, Ireland   from 1637 until 1639.

References

Deans of Ross, Ireland
17th-century Irish Anglican priests
Year of birth missing
Year of death missing